The 92nd Street station was a local station on the demolished IRT Second Avenue Line in Manhattan, New York City. It had three tracks and two side platforms. The next stop to the north was 99th Street. The next stop to the south was 86th Street. The station closed on June 11, 1940. Four blocks to the north mass transit service was replaced by the 96th Street station of the Second Avenue Subway.

References

External links 
 

IRT Second Avenue Line stations
Railway stations closed in 1940
Former elevated and subway stations in Manhattan
1940 disestablishments in New York (state)